Conichnus is an ichnogenus of trace fossil.

See also
 Ichnology

External links
 Chuck D. Howell's Ichnogenera Photos

Trace fossils